A king cake, also known as a three kings cake, is a cake associated in many countries with Epiphany. Its form and ingredients are variable, but in most cases a  such as a figurine, often said to represent the Christ Child, is hidden inside. After the cake is cut, whoever gets the fève wins a prize. Modern fèves can be made of other materials, and can represent various objects and people.

History

In Western Christian tradition, Epiphany (also known as "Three Kings Day") celebrates the visit of the Magi to the Christ Child.  From the 19th century onwards, the tradition of the King cake has been associated with the Epiphany ("appearance" in Greek). The three kings cake takes its name from the Biblical Magi, also referred to as the three kings: Melchior, Balthazar and Gaspard, who came to Jesus to offer him gifts, twelve days after his birth. The Eve of Epiphany is known as Twelfth Night, which is the last day of the Christmas season, and Epiphany Day itself commences the Epiphany season. 

The origin of the cake tradition seems to be related to the Roman Saturnalia. These were festivals dedicated to the god Saturn so that the Roman people, in general could celebrate the longer days that began to come after the winter solstice. 

In the Middle Ages, it was said that the king who was chosen had to pay the assembly a general round of drinks. To prevent cheating, the edible bean was replaced by a porcelain bean.

Later, Spanish and French settlers brought it to America. It often includes a figurine, and it is believed that the individual who discovers it will have good fortune. In some regions, the three kings cake is consumed throughout Epiphanytide until the first day of Lent, Ash Wednesday.

Regional variants

French-speaking countries and regions

In most of France it is a puff pastry filled with frangipane. As for the frangipane, it might come from Count Cesare Frangipani, who would have given the recipe that bears his name to Catherine de Medici.

A paper crown is included with purchased cakes to crown the "king" or "queen" who finds the "" or bean hidden inside the cake. To ensure a random distribution of the pieces, the youngest person is to place themselves under the table and name the recipient of each piece as they are cut. When store-bought, the  can be a tiny porcelain figurine of a religious character or, nowadays, a figurine referencing pop-culture or popular cartoons.

German-speaking countries
The German and Swiss Dreikönigskuchen 'three kings cake' are shaped like wreathes or rounds, and uses an almond as the fève.

Portugal
Bolo-rei is a traditional Portuguese cake eaten from the beginning of December until Epiphany.

The recipe is derived from the French  which found its way to Portugal during the 1800s when  opened as the Portuguese monarchy's official bakery in 1829.

The cake is round with a large hole in the centre, resembling a crown covered with crystallized and dried fruit.

It is baked from a soft, white dough, with raisins, various nuts and crystallized fruit. Also included is the dried fava bean, and tradition dictates that whoever finds the fava has to pay for the cake next year.

Spanish-speaking countries

The Roscón de Reyes is eaten in Spain, Latin America and the United States. Recipes vary from country to country and between cultures but tend to be similar. It generally has an oval shape due to the need to make cakes large enough for large groups. For decoration, figs, quinces, cherries, or dried and candied fruits are often, but not exclusively, used. The tradition of placing a bean, candy or figurine inside the cake that diners find in their slice is followed.

In Spain consists on a sweet brioche dough aromatised with orange blossom water and decorated with slices of candied or crystallized fruit of various colors. It can be filled with whipped cream, cream, almond paste or others. The figurine traditionally represents one of the Three Wise Men Biblical Magi. A dry broad bean is also introduced inside the roscón. It is tradition that whoever finds the bean pays for the roscón.

In central and South America the figurine represents the Child Jesus. The figurine of the baby Jesus hidden in the bread represents the flight of the Holy Family, fleeing from Herod the Great's Massacre of the Innocents. Whoever finds the baby Jesus figurine is blessed and must take the figurine to the nearest church on Candlemas Day or host a party that day.

United Kingdom
The Twelfth Cake, Twelfth-night cake, or Twelfth-tide cake was once popular in the United Kingdom on Twelfth Night. It was frequently baked with a bean hidden in one side and a pea hidden in the other; the man/lord finding the bean became King for the night, while the woman/lady finding the pea became the Queen – also known as the Lord or Lady of Misrule. Earlier, in the time of Shakespeare, there was only a Lord of Misrule, chosen by the hidden bean, reflected in Shakespeare's play Twelfth Night.

Samuel Pepys recorded a party in London on Epiphany night 1659/1660, and described the role the cake played in the choosing of a "King" and "Queen" for the occasion: "...to my cousin Stradwick, where, after a good supper, there being there my father, mothers, brothers, and sister, my cousin Scott and his wife, Mr. Drawwater and his wife, and her brother, Mr. Stradwick, we had a brave cake brought us, and in the choosing, Pall was Queen and Mr. Stradwick was King. After that my wife and I bid adieu and came home, it being still a great frost."

Although still occasionally found in the United Kingdom, as the Industrial Revolution curtailed the celebration of the 12 days of Christmas during the Victorian era, the cake declined in popularity to be replaced by the Christmas cake. 18th century actor Robert Baddeley's will bequeathed £3 per annum to serve wine, punch and a Twelfth Night cake to the performers of the Drury Lane Theatre in the green room each Twelfth Night; the ceremony of the "Baddeley Cake" has remained a regular event, missed only 13 times in over 200 years, during wartimes or theatre closures.

United States

In Louisiana and parts of the Gulf Coast region historically settled by the French, king cake is associated with Mardi Gras and is traditionally served from Epiphany until Carnival. and recently year-round. It may have been introduced by Basque settlers in 1718, or by the French in 1870.

It comes in a number of styles. The most simple, said to be the most traditional, is a ring of twisted cinnamon roll-style dough. It may be topped with icing or sugar, which may be colored to show the traditional Mardi Gras colors of purple for justice, green for faith, and gold for power.

Cakes may also be filled with cream cheese, praline, cinnamon, or strawberry. The "Zulu King Cake" has chocolate icing with a coconut filling.

Traditionally, a small porcelain baby, symbolizing Jesus, is hidden in the king cake and is a way for residents of New Orleans to celebrate their Christian faith. The baby symbolizes luck and prosperity to whoever finds it. That person is also responsible for purchasing next year's cake or hosting the next Mardi Gras party. Often, bakers place the baby outside of the cake, leaving the purchaser to hide it themselves. This is usually to avoid liability for any choking hazard.

In 2009, the New Orleans Pelicans basketball team introduced the King Cake Baby as a seasonal mascot. The New Orleans Baby Cakes (formerly the Zephyrs) were a AAA baseball team that played their final three seasons (2017–2019) with that name before relocating and becoming the Wichita Wind Surge.

Greece 
It is traditionally served on 1 January, the feast day of Saint Basil of Caesarea, and not for Epiphany; therefore, it not linked with the Biblical Magi.

Gallery

See also

Barmbrack: a bread is associated with Hallowe'en in Ireland, where an item (often a ring) is placed inside the bread, with the person who receives it considered fortunate.
Black bun: a Scottish fruit cake covered with pastry, originally eaten on Twelfth Night but now enjoyed at Hogmanay.
 Bean-feast
 Bread in Spain
 Ensaïmada
Panettone: an Italian sweet bread served during the Christmas period.
Vasilopita: a cake eaten on New Year's Day in Greece, associated with Saint Basil.

References

Bibliography
 1991. Tradiciones Mexicanas. Pg 22, 31. Mexico, D.F., Ed. Diana S.A. de C.V., 
 1998. Fiestas de México. Pg. 76, Mexico, D.F., Panorama Editorial S.A. de C.V, 
 Primarily subhead Popular Merrymaking under Liturgy and Custom.
 Christmas Trivia edited by Jennie Miller Helderman, Mary Caulkins. Gramercy, 2002
 Marix-Evans, Martin. The Twelve Days of Christmas. Peter Pauper Press, 2002
 Bowler, Gerry. The World Encyclopedia of Christmas. McClelland & Stewart, 2004
 Collins, Ace. Stories Behind the Great Traditions of Christmas. Zondervan, 2003

External links

Recipes: Portugal’s Bolo Rei
EuroMaxx A La Carte Bolo Rei from Portugal recipe

Christmas food
Culture of New Orleans
Epiphany (holiday)
Sweet breads
Yeast breads
Carnival foods
Cuisine of New Orleans
Christmas in Spain
Christmas in the United Kingdom
French cakes
Catholic cuisine
Christmas cakes